In 2000, the UK Ministry of Defence (MOD) defined bullying as: "...the use of physical strength or the abuse of authority to intimidate or victimise others, or to give unlawful punishments." A review of a number of deaths, supposedly by suicide, at Princess Royal Barracks, Deepcut by Nicholas Blake QC indicated that whilst a bullying culture existed during the mid to late 1990s many of the issues were being addressed as a result of the Defence Training Review.

Some argue that this behaviour should be allowed because of a general academic consensus that "soldiering" is different from other occupations. Soldiers expected to risk their lives should, according to them, develop strength of body and spirit to accept bullying.

In some countries, ritual hazing amongst recruits has been tolerated and even lauded as a rite of passage that builds character and toughness; while in others, systematic bullying of lower-ranking, young or physically slight recruits may in fact be encouraged by military policy, either tacitly or overtly (see dedovshchina).

See also
 Military
 Military abuse

References

External links 
 Field T Bullying, harassment and suicide in the military armed services
 Film leads to Army bullying probe BBC News 2 August 2005
 Russian army bullying 'horrific' BBC News 20 October 2004
 Brazil army probes torture video BBC News 15 November 2005

Military
Military life